The 1917 Montana State Bobcats football team was an American football team that represented the Montana State College (later renamed Montana State University) during the 1917 college football season. In its fourth and final season under head coach Fred Bennion, the team compiled a 0–2–2 record and was outscored by a total of 69 to 41.

Montana State was admitted as a member of the Rocky Mountain Conference (RMC) in 1917. The football team's record against conference opponents was 0–1–2.

Washington Boberg was Montana State's 1917 team captain.

Schedule

References

Montana State
Montana State Bobcats football seasons
Montana State Bobcats football